The Periplus of the Erythraean Sea (modern Greek ), also known by its Latin name as the , is a Greco-Roman periplus written in Koine Greek that describes navigation and trading opportunities from Roman Egyptian ports like Berenice Troglodytica along the coast of the Red Sea, and others along Horn of Africa, the Persian Gulf, Arabian Sea and the Indian Ocean, including the modern-day Sindh region of Pakistan and southwestern regions of India.

The text has been ascribed to different dates between the first and third centuries, but a mid-first-century date is now the most commonly accepted. While the author is unknown, it is clearly a first-hand description by someone familiar with the area and is nearly unique in providing accurate insights into what the ancient Hellenic world knew about the lands around the Indian Ocean.

Name

A periplus (períplous, ."a sailing-around") is a logbook recording sailing itineraries and commercial, political, and ethnological details about the ports visited. In an era before maps were in general use, it functioned as a combination atlas and traveller's handbook.

The Erythraean Sea (Erythrà Thálassa, ."the Red Sea") was an ancient geographical designation that always included the Gulf of Aden between Arabia Felix and the Horn of Africa and was often extended (as in this periplus) to include the present-day Red Sea, Persian Gulf, and Indian Ocean as a single maritime area.

Date and authorship
The 10th-century Byzantine manuscript which forms the basis of present knowledge of the Periplus attributes the work to Arrian, but apparently for no better reason than its position beside Arrian's much later Periplus of the Black Sea.

One historical analysis, published by Schoff in 1912, narrowed the date of the text to AD5962, in agreement with present-day estimates of the middle of the 1st century. Schoff additionally provides an historical analysis as to the text's original authorship, and arrives at the conclusion that the author was a "Greek in Egypt, a Roman subject". By Schoff's calculations, this would have been during the time of Tiberius Claudius Balbilus (who coincidentally also was an Egyptian Greek).

Schoff continues by noting that the author could not have been "a highly educated man" as "is evident from his frequent confusion of Greek and Latin words and his clumsy and sometimes ungrammatical constructions".  Because of "the absence of any account of the journey up the Nile and across the desert from Coptos", Schoff prefers to pinpoint the author's residence to "Berenice rather than Alexandria".

John Hill maintains that "the Periplus can now be confidently dated to between AD 40 and 70 and, probably, between AD 40 and 50." This dating corresponds with the argumentation of L. Casson ("between A.D. 40 and 70") in his key book The Periplus Maris Erythraei text with introduction, translation and commentary

Synopsis

The work consists of 66 sections, most of them about the length of a long paragraph.  For instance, the short section 9 reads in its entirety:

In many cases, the description of places is sufficiently accurate to identify their present locations; for others, there is considerable debate.  For instance, "Rhapta" is mentioned as the farthest market down the African coast of "Azania", but there are at least five locations matching the description, ranging from Tanga to south of the Rufiji River delta. The description of the Indian coast mentions the Ganges River clearly, yet after that it is ambiguous, describing China as a "great inland city Thina" that is a source of raw silk.

The Periplus says that a direct sailing route from the Red Sea to the Indian peninsula across the open ocean was discovered by Hippalus (1st centuryBC).

Many trade goods are mentioned in the Periplus, but some of the words naming trade goods are found nowhere else in ancient literature, leading to guesswork as to what they might be. For example, one trade good mentioned is "lakkos chromatinos". The name lakkos appears nowhere else in ancient Greek or Roman literature. The name re-surfaces in late medieval Latin as lacca, borrowed from medieval Arabic lakk in turn borrowed from Sanskritic lakh, meaning lac i.e. a red-coloured resin native to India used as a lacquer and used also as a red colourant. Some other named trade goods remain obscure.

Himyarite kingdom and Saba

Ships from Himyar regularly travelled the East African coast. The Periplus of the Erythraean Sea describes the trading empire of Himyar and Saba, regrouped under a single ruler, "Charibael" (probably Karab'il Watar Yuhan'em II), who is said to have been on friendly terms with Rome:

Frankincense kingdom
The Frankincense kingdom is described further east along the southern coast of the Arabian Peninsula, with the harbour of Cana (South Arabic Qana, modern Bi'r Ali in Hadramaut). The ruler of this kingdom is named Eleazus, or Eleazar, thought to correspond to King Iliazz Yalit I:

Somalia

Ras Hafun in northern Somalia is believed to be the location of the ancient trade centre of Opone. Ancient Egyptian, Roman and Persian Gulf pottery has been recovered from the site by an archaeological team from the University of Michigan. Opone is in the thirteenth entry of the Periplus of the Erythraean Sea, which in part states:

In ancient times, Opone operated as a port of call for merchants from Phoenicia, Egypt, Greece, Persia, Yemen, Nabataea, Azania, the Roman Empire and elsewhere, as it possessed a strategic location along the coastal route from Azania to the Red Sea. Merchants from as far afield as Indonesia and Malaysia passed through Opone, trading spices, silks and other goods, before departing south for Azania or north to Yemen or Egypt on the trade routes that spanned the length of the Indian Ocean's rim. As early as AD50, Opone was well known as a center for the cinnamon trade, along with the trading of cloves and other spices, ivory, exotic animal skins and incense.

The ancient port city of Malao, situated in present-day Berbera in north central Somaliland, is also mentioned in the Periplus:

Aksum Empire

Aksum is mentioned in the Periplus as an important market place for ivory, which was exported throughout the ancient world:

According to the Periplus, the ruler of Aksum was Zoscales, who, besides ruling in Aksum also held under his sway two harbours on the Red Sea: Adulis (near Massawa) and Avalites (Assab). He is also said to have been familiar with Greek literature:

Rhapta

Recent research by the Tanzanian archaeologist Felix A. Chami has uncovered extensive remains of Roman trade items near the mouth of the Rufiji River and the nearby Mafia island, and makes a strong case that the ancient port of Rhapta was situated on the banks of the Rufiji River just south of Dar es Salaam.

The Periplus informs us that:

Chami summarizes the evidence for Rhapta's location as follows:

In recent years, Felix Chami has found archaeological evidence for extensive Roman trade on Mafia Island and, not far away, on the mainland, near the mouth of the Rufiji River, which he dated to the first few centuries. Furthermore, J. Innes Miller points out that Roman coins have been found on Pemba island, just north of Rhapta.

Nevertheless, Carl Peters has argued that Rhapta was near modern-day Quelimane in Mozambique, citing the fact that (according to the Periplus) the coastline there ran down towards the southwest. Peters also suggests that the description of the "Pyralaoi" (i.e., the "Fire people") – "situated at the entry to the [Mozambique] Channel" – indicates that they were the inhabitants of the volcanic Comoro Islands. He also maintains that Menuthias (with its abundance of rivers and crocodiles) cannot have been Zanzibar; i.e., Madagascar seems more likely.

The Periplus informs us that Rhapta, was under the firm control of a governor appointed by Arabian king of Musa, taxes were collected, and it was serviced by "merchant craft that they staff mostly with Arab skippers and agents who, through continual intercourse and intermarriage, are familiar with the area and its language".

The Periplus explicitly states that Azania (which included Rhapta) was subject to "Charibael", the king of both the Sabaeans and Homerites in the southwest corner of Arabia. The kingdom is known to have been a Roman ally at this period. Charibael is stated in the Periplus to be "a friend of the (Roman) emperors, thanks to continuous embassies and gifts" and, therefore, Azania could fairly be described as a vassal or dependency of Rome, just as Zesan is described in the 3rd-century Chinese history, the Weilüe.

Bharuch

Trade with the Indian harbour of Barygaza is described extensively in the Periplus. Nahapana, ruler of the Indo-Scythian Western Satraps is mentioned under the name Nambanus, as ruler of the area around Barigaza:

Under the Western Satraps, Barigaza was one of the main centres of Roman trade in the subcontinent. The Periplus describes the many goods exchanged:

Goods were also brought down in quantity from Ujjain, the capital of the Western Satraps:

Early Chera, Pandyan, and Chola kingdoms

The lost port city of Muziris (near present day Kodungallur) in the Chera kingdom, as well as the Early Pandyan Kingdom are mentioned in the Periplus as major centres of trade, pepper and other spices, metal work and semiprecious stones, between Damirica and the Roman Empire.

According to the Periplus, numerous Greek seamen managed an intense trade with Muziris:

Damirica or Limyrike is Tamilagam (Tamil தமிழகம்) – the "Tamil country". Further, this area served as a hub for trade with the interior, in the Gangetic plain:

Indian–Chinese border
The Periplus also describes the annual fair in present-day Northeast India, on the border with China.

Sêsatai are the source of malabathron. Schoff's translation mentions them as Besatae: they are a people similar to Kirradai and they lived in the region between "Assam and Sichuan".

Remains of the Indo-Greek kingdom

The Periplus claims that Greek buildings and wells exist in Barigaza, falsely attributing them to Alexander the Great, who never went this far south. This account of a kingdom tracing its beginnings to Alexander's campaigns and the Hellenistic Seleucid empire that followed:

The Periplus further claims to the circulation of Indo-Greek coinage in the region:

The Greek city of Alexandria Bucephalous on the Jhelum River is mentioned in the Periplus, as well as in the Roman Peutinger Table:

Manuscripts 
The Periplus was originally known only through a single manuscript dating from the 14th or 15th century, now held by the British Museum. This edition proved to be a corrupt and error-ridden copy of a 10th-century Byzantine manuscript in minuscule hand. The 10th-century manuscript placed it beside Arrian's Periplus of the Black Sea and (apparently mistakenly) also credited Arrian with writing it as well. The Byzantine manuscript was taken from Heidelberg to Rome during the Thirty Years' War (1618–1648), then to Paris under Napoleon after his army's conquest of the Papal States in the late 1790s, then returned to Heidelberg's University Library in 1816 where it remains.

Editions
The British manuscript was edited by Sigmund Gelen in Prague and first published by Hieronymus Froben in 1533. This error-ridden text served as the basis for other editions and translations for three centuries, until the restoration of the original manuscript to Heidelberg in 1816.

Schoff's heavily annotated 1912 English translation was itself based on a defective original; as late as the 1960s, the only trustworthy scholarly edition was Frisk's 1927 French study.

See also
 Agatharchides, author of On the Erythraean Sea
 Silk Road
 Indo-Roman relations
 Indo-Roman trade relations
 Ancient Greece–Ancient India relations

References

Citations

Bibliography

 .
 .
 . 
 . 
  
 
 .
 . 
 .
 .
 
 .
 . & 
 
  Also Volume II.

External links

 Schoff's 1912 text at the University of Washington, emended with additional commentary, spellings, and translations from Casson's edition
 Schoff's 1912 text at Fordham University's Ancient History Sourcebook
 1879 text by John Watson McCrindle at Project Gutenberg
 Interactive map from Digital Maps of the Ancient World

 
1st-century books
Foreign relations of ancient Rome
Classical geography
Africa–India relations
History of Pakistan
History of the Red Sea
Peripluses in Greek
Indian Ocean trade